HMS Grafton was a 70-gun third rate ship of the line of the Royal Navy. She was built by Swallow and Fowler, of Limehouse, London to the dimensions of the 1706 Establishment, and was launched on 9 August 1709.

She spent some time under the command of George Forbes, 3rd Earl of Granard, and by 1718 she was commanded by Nicholas Haddock, and was present at the Battle of Cape Passaro. By 1738 she was stationed at the Nore, when she was commanded by Richard Lestock.

On 21 September 1722 Grafton was ordered to be taken to pieces and rebuilt to the 1719 Establishment at Woolwich, from where she was relaunched on 25 November 1725. She remained in service until 1744, when she was broken up.

Notes

References

 
 Lavery, Brian (2003) The Ship of the Line - Volume 1: The development of the battlefleet 1650-1850. Conway Maritime Press. .

 

Ships of the line of the Royal Navy
1700s ships